Veteran is a 2015 South Korean action comedy film written and directed by Ryoo Seung-wan. It drew 13.4 million admissions, making it the 5th all-time highest-grossing film in South Korean cinema history. Veteran also won the Casa Asia Award at the Sitges Film Festival.

Plot
Seo Do-cheol is a merciless police detective, who investigates the suicide of a truck driver named Bae, where he learns from Bae's son that Jo Tae-oh, the sadistic third-generation heir to powerful conglomerate Sinjin Group has assaulted Bae as the latter protested against the conglomerate for back-payment. Do-cheol personally begins the investigation, which enrages Tae-oh. Later, Tae-oh uses his influence to make Do-cheol handle another case. He also tries to bribe Do-cheol's wife with the help of his conglomerate's SVP Choi Dae-woong, but she refuses,  where Do-cheol threatens Tae-oh after learning this.

Do-cheol takes the help from a reporter to publish the news, but to no avail. Tae-oh hires a logistics contractor named Jeon to finish Do-cheol and also makes the Internal affairs to interrogate him, but is timely saved by his team leader Oh. Do-cheol escapes from a murder attempt by Jeon, where a detective gets stabbed. Using the opportunity, Do-cheol and his team discover evidences and gets approval for the investigation against Tae-oh, but Tae-oh's father and the conglomerate chairman Jo makes Dae-woong to take the blame. With his team's help, Do-cheol learns that Bae was killed after he tried to seek revenge for assaulting him, and was made it as a suicide. 

After inquiring Dae-woong, Do-cheol learns that Tae-oh is planning to escape to Singapore. Before leaving, Tae-oh throws a party where he meets his former girlfriend Jeong Da-hye (who is pregnant with his child) and tries to kill her when she abuses him. Do-cheol forms a plan where they plant a false case against Tae-oh for assaulting his girlfriend, and the cops fight with the bodyguards to arrest him. After an intense car chase, Do-cheol and Tae-oh engage in a hand-to-hand combat where despite brutal injuries, Do-cheol manages to arrest Tae-oh, who is later produced for a trial at the Supreme Court along with Dae-woong, and are sentenced to prison. In the hospital, Do-cheol recovers from his injuries and soon returns back to duty.

Cast

Hwang Jung-min as Seo Do-cheol
Yoo Ah-in as Jo Tae-oh
Yoo Hae-jin as Choi Dae-woong
Oh Dal-su as Team leader Oh
Jang Yoon-ju as Miss Bong
Kim Shi-hoo as Detective Yoon
Oh Dae-hwan as Detective Wang 
Jung Woong-in as Driver Bae
Jung Man-sik as Chief Jeon
Song Young-chang as Chairman Jo
Jin Kyung as Joo-yeon
Yoo In-young as Jeong Da-hye
Park So-dam as "the youngest"
Lee Dong-hwi as Yoon Hong-ryeol
Bae Sung-woo as Used cars business owner
Chun Ho-jin as Regional investigation unit senior superintendent 
Jang So-yeon as Driver Bae's wife
Kim Jae-hyeon as Driver Bae's son
Park Jong-hwan as Team leader Yang 
Uhm Tae-goo as Jo Tae-oh's bodyguard 
Park Ji-hoon as Security manager
Jo Yeon-hee as Contract worker
Shin Seung-hwan as Reporter Park 
Yeo Ho-min as Director Kim 
Lee Ye-won as Jo Tae-oh's hair stylist 2 
Park Ji-yoon as News reporter (voice)
Ahn Gil-kang as Jurisdiction police chief (cameo)
Ma Dong-seok as Big guy with sportswear (cameo)
Kim Eung-soo as Adviser Jeong (cameo)

Box office
Veteran opened in South Korea on August 5, 2015. It grossed  from 2.75 million admissions over its first five days of release. By November 6, it had grossed  from 13,411,343 admissions and is currently the 5th all-time highest-grossing film in Korean cinema history.

Sequel
Ryoo Seung-wan and production company Filmmaker R&K confirmed that they agreed to make a sequel, which was supposed to hit theaters within two to three years of announcement. It was reported that Hwang Jung-min and Oh Dal-su will reprise their roles, and actor Jung Hae-in is also being considered to succeed Yoo Ah-in as the antagonist. It began filming as Veteran 2 in December 2022 with the cast of Hwang Jung-min, Oh Dal-su, Jang Yoon-ju, Oh Dae-hwan, and Kim Si-hoo.

Remake
A Chinese remake starring Sun Honglei was scheduled for release in China in 2017. Eventually, the remake The Big Shot was released in 2019 and starred Wang Qianyuan.

Awards and nominations

References

External links
 

2015 films
2010s crime comedy films
2015 action comedy films
South Korean action comedy films
South Korean crime comedy films
Police detective films
Films shot in Busan
Films directed by Ryoo Seung-wan
2010s Korean-language films
South Korean films remade in other languages
CJ Entertainment films
2010s South Korean films